Alfageme is a surname. Notable people with the surname include:

 Armando Alfageme (born 1990), Peruvian footballer
 Luis Maria Alfageme (born 1984), Argentine footballer